A freshman, first year, or frosh, is a person in the first year at an educational institution, usually a secondary or post-secondary school.

Frosh may also refer to:

 Brian Frosh (born 1946), American politician from Maryland
 Frosh (album series), a compilation album series released on Polygram Records in the late 1990s and early 2000s
 Drumheller Fountain, also known as the Frosh Pond, an outdoor fountain on the University of Washington campus